Strání is a municipality and village in Uherské Hradiště District in the Zlín Region of the Czech Republic. It has about 3,400 inhabitants.

Administrative parts
The village of Květná is an administrative part of Strání.

Etymology
The name Stráně is derived from the Czech word stráně (i.e. "slopes"). The name reflects the location of the village in a valley.

Geography
It lies in the White Carpathians mountain range and eponymous protected landscape area. The built-up area is located in the valley of the stream Klanečnice, which springs in the hills in the western part of the municipality.

History
Strání is located in an ancient mining area and an apparent settlement area of the Stone Age Corded Ware Culture (2,900–2,350 BC). In the 11th and 12th centuries the area of Strání was on the so-called Hungarian Way. This road was used by Bohemian troops as they marched to attack the Turks and Tatars in Hungary. After the mid-13th century, it became an important commercial link between Hungary and Czech lands.

The first written mention of Strání is from 1318. In 1359, Strání was first referred to as a market town. In 1483, tolls were collected in Strání for the upkeep of the commercial road, and in 1492 Strání included 44 houses and 2 mills. In 1502, John Bernard of Kunovice acquired the Ostroh estate, including Strání.

In 1605, the market town of Strání was devastated by the Stephen Bocskai's army and became a village again. The Bernard sof Kunovice family owned the estate until the Battle of White Mountain in 1618, when their lands were confiscated from them by the Emperor because the family supported the failed rebellion against him. In 1625, the estate was sold to the Liechtenstein family, which maintained ownership of Strání until 1945.

Until 1943, there was a thriving Jewish community in Strání, but in that year the Nazis deported all the Jews to the Theresienstadt concentration camp. Even so, several buildings in Strání are still architecturally ornamented with the Star of David.

Economy

In 1794, the Liechtensteins, thanks to beech forests, high-quality glass sand and the close proximity of an important trade route to Hungary, chose Strání as the location of a glass works. Glass production began in the summer of 1795 and has been continuous since that time. In 1897 Květná was only the second glass factory in Europe to introduce etched glass production. It is one of the longest-running glassworks in the country and oldest in Europe.

Education
There are two kindergartens and a primary school in the municipality.

Sights

The Church of the Exaltation of the Holy Cross is in the centre of Strání. The original parish church was first commissioned by Prince Wenceslaus von Liechtenstein in 1749. and was built with material taken from the ruins of a fortress. The church was damaged by a fire in 1893 and demolished in 1908. In 1909–1911, a new church was built in the Neo-Gothic style.

Štrbákovec is a 19th-century house that is a valuable example of folk architecture. Today it is used for cultural purposes.

Zámeček is a two-story château with vaulted ceilings. It is a former manor house first documented in 1592 and later a hunting château. In the 18th century, it was an administrative building of the Liechtensteins. In 2010, it was repaired and the building today serves as a hotel with a restaurant owned by the municipality.

Cultural references
In Leoš Janáček's opera The Cunning Little Vixen, the priest moves to Strání, expressing the hope that life will be better there. It is one of the only two place names mentioned in the opera (the other being Brno).

Notable people
Ondřej Benešík (born 1976), politician; lives here

Twin towns – sister cities

Strání is twinned with:
 Euratsfeld, Austria

References

External links

Villages in Uherské Hradiště District